Desert Winds High School was an intervention/retention high school in Casa Grande, Arizona. There are two sessions in the school: Credit Recovery and Alternative. Credit Recovery meets in the morning, and the alternative school meets in the afternoon. It was part of the Casa Grande Union High School District. This school is currently closed.

Public high schools in Arizona
Schools in Pinal County, Arizona
Buildings and structures in Casa Grande, Arizona